Thaumatopsis solutellus is a moth in the family Crambidae. It was described by Zeller in 1863. It is found in North America, where it has been recorded from Indiana, Maryland, Massachusetts, New Hampshire, New Jersey and Ontario.

The wingspan is 20–23 mm. Adults are on wing in September and October.

References

Crambini
Moths described in 1863
Moths of North America